Masueh (also Romanized as Māsūeh; also known as Māsū) is a village in Beygom Qaleh Rural District, in the Central District of Naqadeh County, West Azerbaijan Province, Iran. At the 2006 census, its population was 682, in 102 families.

References 

Populated places in Naqadeh County